Kosh-Döbö (or Kosh-Debe) is a village in the Nookat District of Osh Region of Kyrgyzstan. Its population was 1,192 in 2021.

References

Populated places in Osh Region